Cade Foehner (born July 24, 1996) is an American singer and musician from Shelbyville, Texas. He was eliminated during top 5 on the 16th season of American Idol.

Biography 
In 2013, Foehner was in a band called Johnson's Lost Crowes. He then auditioned for season 16 of American Idol and is now doing music as a solo artist.

Foehner and fellow Idol contestant Gabby Barrett married on October 5, 2019, with Jeremy Vuolo from Counting On officiating.  On August 16, 2020, the couple announced that they were expecting their first child together, a girl, due in early 2021. Barrett gave birth to their daughter on January 18, 2021. On October 27, 2022, they welcomed a second child, a son.

References 

1996 births
21st-century American male singers
21st-century American singers
American Idol participants
Living people
Singers from Texas